The Chrysler Open was a women's professional golf tournament on the Ladies European Tour that took place in Sweden. 

Held at Sjögärde Golf Club in 1998, the tournament was moved to Halmstad Golf Club, host of the 2007 Solheim Cup, in 1999.  The tournament's name is the result of a sponsorship agreement with Harry Karlsson Bilimport AB, importer of Chrysler vehicles. 

Laura Davies won the 1998 and 1999 installments scoring 284 (72-71-71-70) and 273 (71-69-66-67). 

Carin Koch won the final tournament after scoring 277 (−11) following rounds of 70-73-65-69, finishing 4 strokes ahead of Samantha Head at 281 and 7 strokes ahead of Sophie Gustafson and Catrin Nilsmark at 284. Laura Davies, at 289 strokes, finished tied for 10th place along with Helen Alfredsson, Judith Van Hagen and Åsa Gottmo (still an amateur).

Winners

References

External links
Ladies European Tour
Official Results Chrysler Open 1998 
Official Results Chrysler Open 1999 
Official Results Chrysler Open 2000 

Former Ladies European Tour events
Golf tournaments in Sweden